Kelappan Thampuran may refer to:

Kelappan Thampuran (cricketer, born 1925)
Kelappan Thampuran (cricketer, born 1937)